Rajendra Agnihotri (1938- 2008) was a leader of Bharatiya Janata Party. He was member of the Ninth, Tenth, Eleventh and Twelfth Lok Sabha  representing the Jhansi of Uttar Pradesh. He also served as a member of the Uttar Pradesh Vidhan Sabha from 1980 to 1985. He died on 5 June 2008.

References

2008 deaths
1938 births
Lok Sabha members from Uttar Pradesh
India MPs 1989–1991
India MPs 1991–1996
India MPs 1996–1997
India MPs 1998–1999
Uttar Pradesh MLAs 1980–1985
People from Jhansi district
Bharatiya Janata Party politicians from Uttar Pradesh